Campione d'Italia (Comasco:) is a comune of the Province of Como in the Lombardy region of Italy and an enclave surrounded by the Swiss canton of Ticino (it is also an exclave).

History

In the first century BC the Romans founded the garrison town of Campilonum to protect their territories from Helvetii invasions.

In 777, Toto of Campione, a local Lombard lord, left his inheritance to the archbishopric of Milan. Ownership was transferred to the abbey of Sant’Ambrogio. In 1512, the surrounding area of Ticino was transferred from the ownership of the bishop of Como to Switzerland by Pope Julius II, as thanks for the support in the War of the Holy League. However, the abbey maintained control over what is now Campione d'Italia and some territory on the western bank of Lake Lugano.

When Ticino chose to become part of the Swiss Confederation in 1798, the people of Campione chose to remain part of Lombardy. In 1800, Ticino proposed exchanging Indemini for Campione. In 1814 a referendum was held, and the residents of Campione opposed it. In 1848, during the wars of Italian unification, Campione petitioned Switzerland for annexation. This was rejected due to the Swiss desire for neutrality.

After Italian unification in 1861, all land west of Lake Lugano and half of the lake were given to Switzerland so that Swiss trade and transport would not have to pass through Italy. The d'Italia was added to the name of Campione in the 1930s by Italian dictator Benito Mussolini and an ornamental gate to the village was built. This was to assert the enclave's Italian character.

During World War II, the US Office of Strategic Services (OSS – the precursor to the CIA), partly through Berne OSS chief Allen Welsh Dulles, maintained a unit in Campione for operations in Italy. At the time the Italian fascist regime did not have control over the enclave. The Swiss ignored the situation as long as the Americans kept a low profile. Postage stamps were issued during this period inscribed "Campione d'Italia" and valued in Swiss currency.

Demography
The population of the enclave according to the Italian Census was:

Economy and administration

Campione has had a considerable amount of economic and administrative integration with Switzerland, but against the wishes of its residents, it formally became part of the EU customs territory on 1 January 2020. VAT will apply, but the tax rate will remain that of Switzerland (much lower than that of Italy). A border crossing will be established.

Prior to that time, it was de facto in the customs territory of Switzerland, meaning most of the public services were carried out by Swiss providers, such as refuse collection, telecommunications, and vehicle registration. The enclave enjoyed considerable tax breaks and was exempt from VAT. Campione d'Italia was one of four Italian cities issued a casino licence and took advantage of this by operating the Casinò di Campione, as gambling laws are less strict than in either Italy or Switzerland; also a legacy of the pre-World War II era.
Although (as part of Italy) the euro is formally the only legal tender, in practice the main operating currency in the commune has been the Swiss franc, but euros are widely accepted. Salaries are paid in Swiss francs.

Pursuant to bilateral agreements, Italians residing in Campione also benefit from many services and facilities located in Swiss territory, such as hospital care, that would otherwise be available only to Swiss residents. People working in Campione but living in Switzerland have access to Swiss unemployment and other state help, which does not apply to those living within Campione village limits, which is legally Italy.

Firefighters and ambulances are provided by the Swiss authorities. However, security is provided by the Carabinieri (Italian military police) and the village also has a Polizia Locale group.

Previously, mail could be sent to Campione using either a Swiss postal code (CH-6911) or an Italian one (IT-22061) via Switzerland or Italy, but the Swiss postal code has ceased to be valid, with mail instead being charged at the same international rate as that between Switzerland and Italy. Consequently, all mail is now processed and delivered by Poste Italiane, not Swiss Post. The telephone system remains Swiss, meaning that calls from Italy and all other countries outside Switzerland require the international dialling code for Switzerland, +41, with the exception of the town hall, which can be reached using the code for Italy, +39. 

Similarly, motor vehicles, which used Ticino registration plates, were no longer allowed to do so, or to be insured in Switzerland. Instead, they were required to be registered in Como. However, electricity has always been supplied from Italy.

Casinò di Campione 

The Casinò di Campione was the largest employer in the municipality up until its closure in 2018. The casino then reopened in 2022. It was founded in 1917, owned by the Italian government, and operated by the municipality. The income from the casino was sufficient for the operation of Campione without the imposition of taxes, or obtaining of other revenue. It was Europe's largest casino.

The casino was declared bankrupt on 27 July 2018. The economic impact was a threat to the entire village, with everything from pizzeria owners and taxi drivers to the municipal fire department on the list of creditors. Locals feared that without the casino, the commune would become a ghost town. Under the customs deal of 2020 Italy agreed to settle debts to Swiss creditors estimated at nearly €5 million. The casino re-opened 26 January 2022.

Education
Schools within the comune are the Scuola Materna G. Garibaldi, the Scuola Elementare, and the Scuola Media.

See also

Büsingen am Hochrhein
List of communes of the Province of Como
List of enclaves and exclaves
Llívia

References

External links
 
 
 
  European Court of Human Rights: Nada v. Switzerland 10593/08

Enclaves and exclaves
Special territories of the European Union
Italy–Switzerland border
Duty-free zones of Europe
Populated places on Lake Lugano